This page list topics related to Deobandi movement.

 Deobandi movement
 Deobandi movement in South Africa
 Deobandi movement in Iran
 Deobandi fiqh
 Deobandi hadith studies
 Deobandi politics
 Deobandi jihadism
 Bibliography of Deobandi Movement
 Deoband–Aligarh relations
 List of Deobandis
 List of Deobandi madrasas
 List of Deobandi organisations
 List of Qawmi Madrasas in Bangladesh
 The Deoband School And The Demand For Pakistan
 Islamic Revival in British India: Deoband, 1860-1900
 Revival from Below: The Deoband Movement and Global Islam

Deobandi movement